This is a list of listed buildings in the Outer Hebrides. The list is split out by parish.

 List of listed buildings in Barra
 List of listed buildings in Barvas
 List of listed buildings in Harris, Western Isles
 List of listed buildings in Lochs, Western Isles
 List of listed buildings in North Uist, Western Isles
 List of listed buildings in South Uist, Western Isles
 List of listed buildings in Stornoway, Western Isles
 List of listed buildings in Uig, Western Isles

Outer Hebrides